Donald F. Parsons, Jr. (born 20th century) is an American former judge who served from October 22, 2003 until October 2015 on the Delaware Court of Chancery with the title of Vice Chancellor.

Education
He is a 1977 graduate of the Georgetown University Law Center, located in Washington, D.C., having previously received a Bachelor of Science degree in electrical engineering from Lehigh University, located in Bethlehem, Pennsylvania.

Career
Before joining the Court of Chancery, Parsons spent over twenty-four years at the firm of Morris, Nichols, Arsht & Tunnell in Wilmington, Delaware, where he was a senior partner. While in private practice, he specialized in intellectual property litigation, participated in numerous jury and non-jury patent trials, and wrote several papers relating to intellectual property law.

Before joining Morris, Nichols in 1979, Parsons clerked for the Honorable James L. Latchum of the United States District Court for the District of Delaware.  Parsons will rejoin Morris, Nichols in March 2016.

He is a past president of the Delaware State Bar Association.

See also

 List of Georgetown University alumni
 List of Lehigh University alumni
 List of patent attorneys and agents
 List of people from Wilmington, Delaware

References

External links
 Delaware State Courts - Court of Chancery - Judges

Year of birth missing (living people)
Place of birth missing (living people)
20th-century births
20th-century American lawyers
21st-century American lawyers
American law firm executives
Delaware lawyers
Georgetown University Law Center alumni
Lehigh University alumni
Living people
American patent attorneys
People from Wilmington, Delaware
Leaders of organizations
Vice Chancellors of Delaware